Vtoraya Pyatiletka or 2-ya Pyatiletka is the name of several rural localities in Russia:
2-ya Pyatiletka, Moscow Oblast, a village in Leontyevskoye Rural Settlement of Stupinsky District of Moscow Oblast
Vtoraya Pyatiletka, Omsk Oblast, a village in Krasnousovsky Rural Okrug of Tyukalinsky District of Omsk Oblast
Vtoraya Pyatiletka, Orenburg Oblast, a settlement in Belogorsky Selsoviet of Belyayevsky District of Orenburg Oblast
2-ya Pyatiletka, Saratov Oblast, a khutor in Novouzensky District of Saratov Oblast
2-ya Pyatiletka, Tambov Oblast, a settlement in Ostroluchinsky Selsoviet of Michurinsky District of Tambov Oblast
Vtoraya Pyatiletka, Volgograd Oblast, a settlement under the administrative jurisdiction of Krasnoslobodsk Town of District Significance, Sredneakhtubinsky District, Volgograd Oblast

See also
2-go otnedeliya sovkhoza "2-ya Pyatiletka", a settlement in Krasnoznamenskoye Rural Settlement of Liskinsky District, Voronezh Oblast.
otdeleniya "2-ya Pyatiletka" sovkhoza "Krasnoye Znamya", a settlement in Rubashevskoye Rural Settlement of Anninsky District, Voronezh Oblast.
Pyatiletka 2-ya, a settlement in Chesmenskoye Rural Settlement of Bobrovsky District, Voronezh Oblast.
sovkhoza "2-ya Pyatiletka", a settlement in Stepnyanskoye Rural Settlement of Liskinsky District, Voronezh Oblast.